Magnús Sólmundarson (born 14 November 1939) is an Icelandic chess player, Icelandic Chess Championship medalist (1973).

Biography
From the mid-1960s to the mid-1970s Magnús Sólmundarson was one of the leading Icelandic chess players. He has regularly participated in Icelandic Chess Championships, which he won silver medal in 1973 after lost play-off against Olafur Magnússon, and Reykjavik International Chess tournaments (1964, 1972, 1974, 1982).

Magnús Sólmundarson played for Iceland in the Chess Olympiads:
 In 1964, at first reserve board in the 16th Chess Olympiad in Tel Aviv (+5, =3, -3),
 In 1970, at first reserve board in the 19th Chess Olympiad in Siegen (+5, =3, -3),
 In 1972, at fourth board in the 20th Chess Olympiad in Skopje (+8, =4, -5),
 In 1976, at fourth board in the 22nd Chess Olympiad in Haifa (+4, =2, -3).

Magnús Sólmundarson played for Iceland in the European Team Chess Championship preliminaries:
 In 1983, at eighth board in the 8th European Team Chess Championship preliminaries (+0, =0, -1).

Magnús Sólmundarson played for Iceland in the Nordic Chess Cups:
 In 1974, at fourth board in the 5th Nordic Chess Cup in Eckernförde (+0, =4, -1) and won team bronze medal,
 In 1976, at fourth board in the 7th Nordic Chess Cup in Bremen (+2, =2, -1).

Also Magnús Sólmundarson has successfully participated in correspondence chess tournaments and won the Icelandic Correspondence Chess Championship (1991–1993).

References

External links

Magnús Sólmundarson chess games at 365chess.com

1939 births
Living people
Icelandic chess players
Chess Olympiad competitors
20th-century chess players